The Parti des déshérités de Madagascar (PADESM, "Party of the Disinherited of Madagascar") was a political party active in Madagascar from June 1946 into the First Republic (1960–1972). It was formed in reaction to the establishment and rapid political success of the Mouvement démocratique de la rénovation malgache (MDRM) political party, formed by Merina elites on a platform of independence from France. While nationalism - and therefore the MDRM - had widespread support from all ethnic communities, PADESM championed the empowerment and equitable government of coastal peoples, who had historically been subjugated by the Merina and feared the MDRM could ensure their return to political dominance upon independence. They actively recruited and campaigned along ethnic lines, initially including coastal peoples and the descendants of Merina slaves, but eventually excluding the latter entirely. The formation and political success of PADESM was actively fostered by the French colonial administration, which manipulated election results in favor of the coastal party.

The nationalist Malagasy Uprising of 1947 led the French colonial administration to dissolve the MDRM and temporarily suspend all other political parties, including PADESM. Tensions between the parties played out during the uprising through targeted acts of violence between supporters of the rival groups. An estimated 1,900 to 5,000 PADESM supporters were killed during the uprising by pro-MDRM nationalist fighters.  After the nationalist movement was crushed in December 1948, PADESM experienced an increase in popularity, aided by continuing French support. The party won several key political elections in the 1950s. Nevertheless, as the process toward independence began, it became fragmented between conservative and progressive factions, with the latter splitting off in December 1956 to form the Parti sociale démocrate (PSD, Social Democratic Party). With this split and independence in 1960, PADESM became moribund.

PADESM has had a lasting impact on political life in Madagascar. Philibert Tsiranana, leader of the PSD, went on to become Madagascar's first president upon independence in 1960. Many other major political figures in Madagascar have connections to PADESM and PSD, including former president Didier Ratsiraka and former prime minister Jacques Sylla. More broadly, the formation of PADESM cemented ethnic rivalries within Malagasy politics, linking the interests of specific ethnic groups with particular political parties.

History

Founding and ideology
They formed the Mouvement démocratique de la rénovation malgache (MDRM) political party together with future writer Jacques Rabemananjara in early 1946. All three leaders were the descendants of Hova Merina who had been politically prominent in the former royal court. The party's platform was built on national independence from France and garnered mass support that cut across geographic, ethnic and class divisions. In November 1946 the trio were elected to represent Madagascar as deputies (députés) in the French National Assembly.

In reaction to the founding of the MDRM, which many non-Merina feared would revive Merina political hegemony, the Party for the Disinherited of Madagascar (Parti des déshérités de Madagascar, PADESM) was formed in June 1946 by members of coastal communities formerly subjugated by the Merina empire, as well as highland-based descendants of former Merina slaves. Militant leader Mahasampo Raveloson was key in the creation of the party. Other founding members included Philibert Tsiranana (who became Madagascar's first president after independence), Albert Sylla (who became Minister of Foreign Affairs under Tsiranana, and whose son, Jacques Sylla, would go on to become Prime Minister of Madagascar under Marc Ravalomanana), and Albert Ratsiraka and Pascale Velonjara, respectively father and father-in-law of future president Didier Ratsiraka.

In July 1946, PADESM was changed to become a direct opposition party to MDRM. Initially a non-nationalist party, PADESM eventually favored a gradual process toward independence that would preserve close ties to France and prevent the reemergence of the precolonial hegemony. It actively recruited membership along ethnic lines to include coastal peoples and the descendants of Merina slaves, attracting a number of intellectual elites and political leaders from coastal areas. Its platform focused on increasing distribution of resources to coastal areas to counterbalance decades of colonial investment in the central highlands.  Over time, the party grew more conservative, and Mahasampo Raveloson led a successful effort to exclude any Merina from the party, including descendants of those who had been enslaved by nobles of their own ethnic group under the Kingdom of Imerina and shared their coastal compatriots' concerns regarding Merina political dominance.

The Socialist-dominated French authorities actively supported PADESM. The French characterized this support as an effort to champion the oppressed masses and strengthen their protection against exploitative Hova elites. Governor General Jules Marcel de Coppet provided the party with space in public buildings for meetings. PADESM candidates in the January 1947 provincial elections received financial support from French settlers owing to the party's favorable disposition to the French administration.

In the critical November 1946 election to select the first ever deputies to represent Madagascar at the French National Assembly, MDRM accused the French administration of stuffing ballot boxes, tampering with electoral rolls, intimidating MDRM candidates and supporters, and blatantly falsifying election results to ensure PADESM victory. Despite these irregularities, MDRM won 71 percent of the vote, and none of the PADESM candidates was elected. While MDRM won decisive victories in the central and eastern province, results were close in the western province, where the MDRM candidate Joseph Raseta won 21,475 votes and the PADESM candidate Totelehibe won 19,014 votes.

Role during and after the Malagasy Uprising
In early 1947 the French administration instituted a new rule that increased the weight of the French vote over the Malagasy vote in selection of candidates, and three PADESM candidates favored by French conservatives were elected to the Conseil de la Republique. The results of the election and popular discontent with French interference served to intensify widespread frustration against the colonial authority and desire for Malagasy self-governance across the island. These factors finally erupted in a nationalist uprising that began on the evening of 29 March 1947 with attacks against a police camp and several French plantations in the eastern rainforest carried out by militant Malagasy nationalists, chief among them the members of the nationalist secret societies Vy Vato Sakelika (VVS) and Jiny.

Despite the role of the militants in leading the Uprising, the colonial authorities immediately accused the MDRM of instigating the movement. This view was echoed by PADESM leaders and shared by the majority of French settlers. The French authorities responded by targeting not only MDRM leaders and members, but also their supporters, drawing the wider population into the conflict. Attacks against the colonial authority in the east were immediately followed by similar actions in the south of the island before rapidly spreading throughout the country. The movement enjoyed particularly strong support in the south, where the revolt attracted as many as one million peasants to fight for the nationalist cause. The French responded with heavy military action and psychological warfare, including incidences of crimes against humanity. Between July and September 1948, most of the key leaders of the Uprising were captured or killed, and the last of the fighters disbanded and fled into the forests in December 1948.

The eruption of the conflict provided the pretext for violence between highland Merina and coastal Malagasy of other ethnic groups. An estimated 1,900 to 5,000 Malagasy PADESM supporters were killed by their pro-MDRM nationalist countrymen during the conflict.

Although the MDRM leadership consistently maintained its innocence, the party was dissolved by the French administration on 10 May 1947, and all other political parties, including PADESM, were temporarily suspended. The banning of MDRM further strengthened PADESM's prominence after the end of the uprising. Between 1951 and 1956, PADESM candidates won three consecutive legislative elections.

Decline
Despite the outward appearance of success, the party was suffering from internal divisions. Other countries under French colonial rule, including Morocco, Indochina and several in West Africa, had either become independent or had begun to negotiate the process to independence; this inspired the hope that Madagascar could follow suit, allowing the tantalizing opportunity for PADESM to wield unfettered power in Malagasy politics.  This emerging possibility fragmented the party, which became paralyzed by in-fighting.  The progressive faction split off to form the Parti sociale démocrate (PSD, Social Democratic Party) in Mahajanga in December 1956, under the leadership of Philibert Tsiranana, a French-educated school teacher of Tsimihety coastal origin, and Andre Raseta.

Legacy
The PSD that emerged from the disintegration of PADESM was a powerful force in Malagasy politics throughout the First Republic. When Madagascar achieved independence in 1960, PSD leader Tsiranana was named the country's first president, a position he held until the rotaka protests forced him to resign in 1972. His administration was succeeded by the socialist nationalist Second Republic under Didier Ratsiraka.

Notes

Bibliography  
 
 
 
 
 
 
 

Defunct political parties in Madagascar
History of Madagascar
1946 establishments in Madagascar
Political parties established in 1946